MWL may refer to:

 Maine Women's Lobby, an organization advocating on behalf of women and girls in Maine
 The Maxwell Show, a radio show airing weekday mornings on WNCX in Cleveland, Ohio
 Mineral Wells Airport, a public-use airfield in Texas (FAA & IATA identification code)
 Miniature Warning Light crossing, a type of level crossing
 Mirandese language, a Romance language spoken in a small area of northeastern Portugal
 Muslim World League, a Pan-Islamic non-governmental organization that propagates Islamic teachings